The World God Only Knows is an anime series based on the manga series of the same name by Tamiki Wakaki. It was produced by Manglobe and directed by Shigehito Takayanagi. One day, out of pride, he accidentally accepts what he assumes to be a challenge for a Bishōjo game when in reality he has accepted a contract from a bumbling demoness named Elsie who asks for his help in capturing runaway spirits from Hell who are hiding in the hearts of girls. The only way to force the spirits out of the girls hearts is by replacing the spirits in the girls' hearts with himself (metaphorically speaking) by making the girls fall in love with him, much to Keima's horror. With the threat of death for both of them should he refuse, Keima has no choice but to help Elsie. Together with his intelligence and knowledge of the dating sim genre and Elsie's magical powers, Keima is about to embark on his greatest challenge. It aired from October 6, 2010 to December 22, 2010.

Four pieces of theme music were used for the first season. Additionally, three special ending theme songs were used, the first,  by Tomo Sakurai in episode 4, the second, "Happy Crescent" by Nao Tōyama in episode 7, and the third,  by Hiro Shimono and Oratorio The World God Only Knows in episode 12.

Episode list

Notes

References
General
 

Specific

2010 Japanese television seasons
The World God Only Knows